Harvey Staunton (21 November 1870 – 14 January 1918) was an English first-class cricketer active 1903–05 who played for Nottinghamshire. He was born in Nottinghamshire; died in Mesopotamia on active service during World War I.

References

1870 births
1918 deaths
English cricketers
Nottinghamshire cricketers
British military personnel killed in World War I